Hamnsund Church is a parish church of the Church of Norway in Ålesund Municipality in Møre og Romsdal county, Norway. It is located in the village of Søvik. It is the church for the Hamnsund parish which is part of the Nordre Sunnmøre prosti (deanery) in the Diocese of Møre. The white, wooden church was built in a long church design in 1875 using plans drawn up by the architect Hagbart Brinchmann. The church seats about 350 people.

History
The people of the Søvik area were part of the Borgund Church parish for a long time. In 1866, it was transferred into the newly created Vatne Church parish. On 19 April 1873, the parish was given permission to establish a chapel at Søvik. The building was designed by Hagbart Brinchmann and it was constructed by the lead builder Knut Stokkeland. It was consecrated in 1875. In 1957, the chapel was expanded and upgraded to the status of a parish church. During the construction, a new choir and sacristy. Before the addition, the choir was set up in the same room as the nave.

See also
List of churches in Møre

References

Buildings and structures in Ålesund
Churches in Møre og Romsdal
Long churches in Norway
Wooden churches in Norway
19th-century Church of Norway church buildings
Churches completed in 1875
1875 establishments in Norway